Jerry William Gibson (February 1, 1915 – March 16, 1952) was an American Negro league pitcher for the Homestead Grays, and the Cincinnati Tigers and the brother of Baseball Hall of Famer Josh Gibson. On July 17, 1938 he pitched a no-hitter.

References

External links
  and Seamheads

1915 births
1952 deaths
Baseball pitchers
Homestead Grays players
Cincinnati Tigers (baseball) players
People from Buena Vista, Georgia
Baseball players from Georgia (U.S. state)
20th-century African-American sportspeople